Gallery Place is the name of two adjacent places in Washington, D.C.:

Gallery Place station, on the Washington metro
Gallery Place (shopping center), shopping center